Hureh (also Romanized as Hūreh; also known as Hora) is a village in Hureh Rural District of Zayandehrud District, Saman County, Chaharmahal and Bakhtiari province, Iran. At the 2006 census, its population was 2,829 in 794 households. The following census in 2011 counted 2,629 people in 836 households. The latest census in 2016 showed a population of 2,548 people in 814 households; it was the largest village in its rural district. The village is populated by Turkic people.

References 

Saman County

Populated places in Chaharmahal and Bakhtiari Province

Populated places in Saman County